Justice Scott may refer to:

 Christopher C. Scott (1807–1859), associate justice of the Arkansas Supreme Court
 Elmon Scott (1853–1921), associate justice of the Washington Supreme Court
 George M. Scott (Minnesota judge) (1922–2006), associate justice of the Minnesota Supreme Court
 George M. Scott (West Virginia judge) (1929–2015), associate justice of the Supreme Court of Appeals of West Virginia
 Gregory K. Scott (c. 1949–2021), associate justice of the Colorado Supreme Court
 Guy C. Scott (1863–1909), associate justice of the Supreme Court of Illinois
 James Scott (judge) (1767–1855), associate justice of the Indiana Supreme Court
 John M. Scott (1824–1898), associate justice of the Supreme Court of Illinois
 John T. Scott (Indiana judge) (1831–1891), associate justice of the Supreme Court of Indiana
 John Scott, 1st Earl of Eldon (1751–1838), Lord High Chancellor of Great Britain
 Josiah Scott (politician) (1803–1879), associate justice of the Ohio Supreme Court
 Richard H. Scott (1858–1917), justice of the Wyoming Supreme Court 
 Thomas Scott (Canadian judge) (1746–1824), chief justice of Upper Canada
 Thomas Scott (Ohio judge) (1772–1856), associate justice of the Ohio Supreme Court
 Will T. Scott (born 1947), associate justice of the Kentucky Supreme Court
 William Scott (Missouri judge) (1804–1862), associate justice of the Supreme Court of Missouri
 William Scott (justice) (d. 1350s), chief justice of the King's Bench

See also
Judge Scott (disambiguation)